Seasoned Wood is an album by pianist Cedar Walton which was recorded in 2008 and released on the Highnote label.

Reception
Allmusic reviewed the album stating "At 74, Walton is as promising and as dizzying a bandleader as ever. His command of the hard bop and post-bop languages and his abilities to reinterpret well-known standards authoritatively are all remarkable...  In sum, Seasoned Wood is a true and exceptional highlight in Walton's career". All About Jazz observed "The title Seasoned Wood may successfully riff on the artist's name and the artistry he brings to the occasion, but as anyone with a fireplace knows, seasoned wood burns hotter and better than regular wood. Indeed, Cedar Walton does so here". JazzTimes called it "primarily a take-no-prisoners quintet date".

Track listing 
All compositions by Cedar Walton except as indicated
 "The Man I Love" (George Gershwin, Ira Gershwin) -   6:24
 "Clockwise" - 7:17
 "Longravity" (Jimmy Heath) - 5:58
 "When Love Is New" - 6:04
 "Hindsight" - 7:13
 "A Nightingale Sang in Berkeley Square" (Eric Maschwitz, Manning Sherwin) - 5:39
 "Plexus" - 6:02
 "John's Blues" - 7:12

Personnel 
Cedar Walton - piano
Jeremy Pelt - trumpet, flugelhorn
Vincent Herring - tenor saxophone
Peter Washington - bass
Al Foster - drums

Production
Don Sickler - producer
Rudy Van Gelder - engineer

References 

Cedar Walton albums
2008 albums
HighNote Records albums
Albums recorded at Van Gelder Studio